Doba is a community in the Kassena Nankana Municipal District in the Upper East Region of Ghana.

References 

Upper East Region
Communities in Ghana